The Governor of Zabaykalsky Krai is the head of the executive branch of government in Zabaykalsky Krai (former Chita Oblast and Agin-Buryat Autonomous Okrug).

List of governors

Chita Oblast (1991–2008) 
Styled as Head of Chita Oblast Administration before 2005.

Agin-Buryat Autonomous Okrug (1991–2008) 

On 1 March 2008, Zabaykalsky Krai was formed as a new region of the Russian Federation, following a referendum of unification of Chita Oblast and Agin-Buryat Autonomous Okrug.

Zabaykalsky Krai (2008–)

Elections

8 September 2019

18 September 2016

 
Zabaykalsky Krai
Politics of Zabaykalsky Krai